El Cedro is a corregimiento in Los Pozos District, Herrera Province, Panama with a population of 503 as of 2010. Its population as of 1990 was 543; its population as of 2000 was 539.

References

Corregimientos of Herrera Province